The 2021 Tameside Metropolitan Borough Council election took place on 6 May 2021 to elect members of Tameside Metropolitan Borough Council in England. This was on the same day as other local elections. One-third of the seats were up for election.

Results

Ward results

Ashton Hurst

Ashton St Michael’s

Ashton Waterloo

Audenshaw

Denton North East

Denton South

Denton West

Droylsden East

Droylsden West

Dukinfield

Dukinfield Stalybridge

Hyde Godley

Hyde Newton

Hyde Werneth

Longdendale

Mossley

St Peters

Stalybridge North

Stalybridge South

References 

Tameside
Tameside Council elections